Hush is an album by Jane Siberry, released in 2000. The album is a collection of traditional folk and gospel songs.

The album was a nominee for Roots & Traditional Album of the Year – Solo at the 2001 Juno Awards.

Track listing
"Jacob's Ladder" (4:08)
"All Through the Night" (4:33)
"Pontchartrain" (6:47)
"Streets of Laredo" (3:01)
"As I Roved Out" (4:38)
"False False Fly" (3:11)
"The Water is Wide" (6:28)
"Swing Low, Sweet Chariot" (4:46)
"Ol' Man River" (4:49) - (Oscar Hammerstein, Jerome Kern)
"O Shenandoah/Sail Away" (5:38)

Personnel
 Jane Siberry - vocals, piano, accordion, harmonica, harp, keyboards
 Sandy Baron - violin
 Jennifer Weeks - oboe on "The Water is Wide"

References

2000 albums
Jane Siberry albums